Barry Scott Collier (born July 15, 1954) is an American college athletics administrator and former basketball coach, currently the athletic director at Butler University in Indianapolis, Indiana, a position he has held since 2006.  Collier served as the head men's basketball coach at Butler from 1989 to 2000 and the University of Nebraska–Lincoln from 2000 to 2006, compiling a career college basketball coaching record of

Playing career
Collier attended Miami Palmetto High School in Pinecrest, Florida, and later received an Associate of Arts degree from Miami Dade Community College in 1974. He transferred to Butler and played basketball under George Theofanis for two seasons, and was named a team captain and co-MVP in 1975–76. As a senior, he averaged 15.2 points and a team-high 7.5 rebounds while earning first team all-conference recognition in the Indiana Collegiate Conference.  He earned a Bachelor of Science degree from Butler in 1976 and a Master of Science degree from Indiana State University in 1977.

Assistant coach
Collier began his coaching career in 1976 at Rose-Hulman Institute of Technology in Terre Haute, Indiana, and then went to the Pacific Northwest, at Seattle Central Community College for a season.

Following the 1983 season and a hundred wins in Moscow, Collier went with Monson to the University of Oregon in the Pac-10. After three years in Eugene, Collier joined the staff of new head coach Mike Montgomery at Stanford University; Montgomery was previously the head coach for eight seasons at Montana in the Big Sky.

Head coach
After #13 Stanford reached the NCAA tournament in 1989, Collier began actively searching for a head coaching position.  When he learned his alma mater had an opening, "he submitted a 45-page proposal on how to revive the Butler program to then university president Geoffrey Bannister. The 34-year-old Collier was put in charge of team that hadn't made the NCAA tournament in nearly thirty years."

Collier took his first head coaching job at Butler in 1989, a position he held until 2000.  During those eleven seasons at Butler, the team had six postseason appearances, including an NCAA Tournament appearance, Butler's first in 35 years.  The Bulldogs had five 20-win seasons, after just two in the prior 91-year history of the program, and was named Midwestern Collegiate Conference (now Horizon League) coach of the year in 1991, 1997, 1999, and 2000.

In April 2000, Collier became the head coach at the University of Nebraska in the Big 12 Conference.  After six seasons, he moved back to Butler to take the position of Vice President and Director of Athletics, two days after entering the school's Athletic Hall of Fame.

Head coaching record

References

External links
 Butler profile

1954 births
Living people
American men's basketball players
Basketball coaches from Florida
Basketball players from Miami
Butler Bulldogs athletic directors
Butler Bulldogs men's basketball coaches
Butler Bulldogs men's basketball players
College men's basketball head coaches in the United States
Idaho Vandals men's basketball coaches
Junior college men's basketball coaches in the United States
Miami Dade Sharks men's basketball players
Nebraska Cornhuskers men's basketball coaches
Oregon Ducks men's basketball coaches
Rose–Hulman Fightin' Engineers men's basketball coaches
Sports coaches from Miami
Stanford Cardinal men's basketball coaches